The Schaufelspitze is a mountain,  in the Sonnjoch Group in the eastern Karwendel between Sonnjoch and the Bettlerkarspitze.

Ascents 
The normal route runs from the Hagelhütten in the Rißtal to the top. It is unmarked and not easy to find, especially in the latschen zone. It has places that require grade I (UIAA) climbing.

A crossing to the Bettlerkarspitze is possible along the arête to the northeast (II).

Literature 
 Walter Klier: Alpenvereinsführer Karwendel alpin; Bergverlag Rother, Munich; 15th edn., 2005; 
 Alpine Club map 5/3 Karwendelgebirge, eastern sheet

External links 
 
 Tour description
 Tour description
 Schaufelspitze via Bettlerkarspitze with short video

Two-thousanders of Austria
Mountains of the Alps
Mountains of Europe
Mountains of Tyrol (state)
Karwendel